Ana Carolina da Fonseca is a Brazilian-American actress, television personality, and model.

Filmography

References

External links 
 
 

Living people
Brazilian people of Portuguese descent
Brazilian female models
Brazilian expatriates in the United States
Female models from Florida
American people of Portuguese descent
American telenovela actresses
American film actresses
American television personalities
American women television personalities
American people of Brazilian descent
Year of birth missing (living people)
21st-century Brazilian women